The Challenger Concepción is a professional tennis tournament played on clay courts. It is currently part of the ATP Challenger Tour. It is held in Concepción, Chile.

Past finals

Singles

Doubles

References

ATP Challenger Tour
Clay court tennis tournaments
Tennis tournaments in Chile
2021 establishments in Chile
Recurring sporting events established in 2021